The 2004 Pan American Men's Handball Championship was the eleventh edition of the tournament, held in Santiago, Chile from 20 to 24 July 2004. It acted as the American qualifying tournament for the 2005 World Championship, where the top three placed team qualied.

Preliminary round
All times are local (UTC−3).

Group A

Group B

Knockout stage

Bracket

Fifth place game

5–8th place semifinals

Semifinals

Seventh place game

Fifth place game

Third place game

Final

Final ranking

All-star team 
All-star team is
 MVP : Bruno Souza, 
 Goalkeeper: Marcão, 
 Left wing: Hélio Justino, 
 Pivot: Gonzalo Carou, 
 Right wing: Federico Besasso, 
 Left back: Bruno Souza, 
 Center back: Matias Lima, 
 Right back: Leonardo Facundo Querín, 

Goalscorer is D. Santiago (Puerto-Rico) with 39 goals.

References

External links
Results on todor66.com

Pan American Men's Handball Championship
2004 in handball
2004 in Chilean sport
International handball competitions hosted by Chile
July 2004 sports events in South America